Descoteaux is a surname. Notable people with the surname include:

Bernard Descôteaux (born 1947), Canadian journalist
David Descôteaux, Canadian journalist
Joseph-Félix Descôteaux (1863–1931), Canadian politician
Matthieu Descoteaux (born 1977), Canadian ice hockey player
Norm Descoteaux (born 1948), Canadian ice hockey player
Pierre Descoteaux (born 1952), Canadian lawyer and politician

See also
Descôteaux v Mierzwinski, a Supreme Court of Canada case
Decoteau (disambiguation)